Allium akaka is a species of onion native to Iran.

formerly included
Several infraspecific names have been coined referring to taxa now generally considered distinct species not to be included in Allium akaka. We give links here to help you locate appropriate information

 Allium akaka subsp. haemanthoides (Boiss. & Reut. ex Regel) Wendelbo, now synonym of Allium haemanthoides Boiss. & Reut. ex Regel
 Allium akaka f. major Turrill, now synonym of Allium ubipetrense R.M.Fritsch
 Allium akaka var. regale Tamamsch, now synonym of Allium materculae Bordz.
 Allium akaka subsp. shelkovnikovii (Grossh.) Wendelbo, now synonym of Allium shelkovnikovii Grossh.

References

akaka
Flora of Iran
Plants described in 1830